
San Pedro Lake is a lake in the Beni Department of Bolivia.

Lakes of Beni Department